Hanzaleh (also Romanized as Ḩanz̧aleh) is a village in Neysan Rural District, Neysan District, Hoveyzeh County, Khuzestan Province, Iran. At the 2006 census, its population was 118, in 14 families.

References 

Populated places in Hoveyzeh County